Rissa Idrettslag is a Norwegian sports club from Rissa, Sør-Trøndelag. It has sections for association football, team handball, gymnastics and track and field. The club was founded in 1920.

References

Official site 

Football clubs in Norway
Association football clubs established in 1920
Sport in Trøndelag
1920 establishments in Norway
Athletics clubs in Norway